Tomás Ribeiro may refer to:
 Tomás Ribeiro (writer)
 Tomás Ribeiro (footballer)